The 1996 Davidoff Swiss Indoors was a men's tennis tournament played on indoor hard courts at the St. Jakobshalle in Basel in Switzerland and was part of the World Series of the 1996 ATP Tour. The tournament ran from 23 September through 29 September 1996. First-seeded Pete Sampras won the singles title.

Finals

Singles

 Pete Sampras defeated  Hendrik Dreekmann 7–5, 6–2, 6–0
 It was Sampras' 7th title of the year and the 45th of his career.

Doubles

 Yevgeny Kafelnikov /  Daniel Vacek defeated  David Adams /  Menno Oosting 6–3, 6–4
 It was Kafelnikov's 7th title of the year and the 22nd of his career. It was Vacek's 3rd title of the year and the 13th of his career.

References

External links
 Official website 
 ATP tournament profile
 ITF tournament edition profile

 
Davidoff Swiss Indoors
Swiss Indoors